Chamaesaracha is a genus of perennial herbs in the nightshade family which are known commonly as five eyes. There are around nine species of five eyes, and they are native to the southwestern and western United States and parts of Mexico. These are hairy plants growing low to the ground and covered in crinkly dull green leaves. The flowers are star-shaped to wheel-shaped and their dried remnants can be found around the fruits, which are spherical berries filled with flat, kidney-shaped seeds.

Selected species:
Chamaesaracha coniodes — gray five eyes
Chamaesaracha coronopus — greenleaf five eyes
Chamaesaracha crenata — toothed five eyes
Chamaesaracha edwardsiana — Edwards Plateau five eyes
Chamaesaracha geohintonii
Chamaesaracha pallida — pale five eyes
Chamaesaracha nana — dwarf chamaesaracha
Chamaesaracha sordida — hairy five eyes
Chamaesaracha villosa — TransPecos five eyes

References

External links
Jepson Manual Treatment

Physaleae
Solanaceae genera
Flora of North America
Taxa named by Asa Gray